The 2016 Nunavut Brier Playdowns were held January 8-10 in Iqaluit. The winning Wade Kingdon rink represented Nunavut at the 2016 Tim Hortons Brier in Ottawa. 

The 2016 Nunavut Brier Playdowns were the inaugural men's championship for the territory, after the territory declined an invitation to the 2015 Brier.

The event was a best of five tournament between the Wade Kingdon rink from Iqaluit and the Arthur Siksik rink from Rankin Inlet. Kingdon won the event in four games.

Teams

Scores

Game #1
January 8, 7:00 pm

Game #2
January 9, 9:30 am

Game #3
January 9, 2:30 pm

Game #4
January 9, 7:30pm

External links
CurlingZone Coverage

Nunavut
Curling in Nunavut
Iqaluit
2016 in Nunavut